Bossico is a comune (municipality) in the Province of Bergamo in the Italian region of Lombardy, located about  northeast of Milan and about  northeast of Bergamo.

Bossico borders the following municipalities: Cerete, Costa Volpino, Lovere, Songavazzo, Sovere.

Twin towns — sister cities
Bossico is twinned with:

  Meyrié, France (1982)

References